Guwanç Rejepow (born on April 20, 1982) is a Turkmen footballer (defender).

Rejepow was part of the squad for the Turkmenistan national football team in the 2012 AFC Challenge Cup qualifying round, participating in the match against India on 25 March 2011.

References

External links

1982 births
Living people
Turkmenistan footballers
Turkmenistan international footballers
2004 AFC Asian Cup players
Association football defenders